Lewis Johnson is an American sports commentator and sports reporter.

Lewis Johnson may also refer to:
Lewis Johnson (footballer), English footballer
Lew Johnson (c. 1840–1910), American minstrel show manager

See also
Louis Johnson (disambiguation)
Lewis Johnston (born 1991), Australian rules footballer
Lewis Johnston (umpire) (1917–1993), New Zealand cricket umpire
S. Lewis Johnson (1915–2004), evangelical pastor and theologian